John Delane (born 13 June 1945) is a Historic Formula One racing driver and businessman from the United States. His race career began in 1987. and includes winning 17 Fédération Internationale de l'Automobile (FIA) Titles. He is among the most successful of historic racing's FIA drivers' champions, competing in Historic Formula One and Formula Junior class. He was the first American to win the overall Historic Formula One Championship, and the first time anyone has won two overall FIA historic championships in the same year.  He is the co-founder of the Team Tyrrell race team

FIA Championships 
In 2007, 2010 and 2011 Delane was the FIA Lurani Formula Junior Champion with his Lotus 18

In 2011 Delane was the FIA Historic Formula One Champion with his Tyrrell 002

In 2013 Delane was the FIA Masters Historic Formula One Champion with his Tyrrell 002

FIA Titles

References 

American Formula One drivers
1945 births
Living people